Zeibekiko is a Greek folk dance.

Origin and history

It takes its name from the Zeybeks, an irregular militia living in the Aegean Region of the Ottoman Empire from late 17th to early 20th centuries. It was first seen at the end of the 17th century in cities such as Constantinople and Smyrni. Evliya Çelebi mentions in his writings that it was danced in Magnesia and in Aydın at local feasts. Originally a dance for two armed people facing one another, it developed into an improvised dance for a single male.

After the population exchange between Greece and Turkey in 1922, the dance became popular also in mainland Greece, in many songs of Laiko music.

Characteristics

It is most commonly broken down as:

or as:

The Zeibeikiko, as an old dance, is strictly for males. Due to the movements of the dancer, it is sometimes known as the "eagle dance". The dance has no set steps, only certain figures and a circular movement. It takes place in an area little surpassing one square metre and mostly consists of improvised movements.

Occasionally dancers perform feats such as standing on a glass of wine or a chair or fireplace, or picking up a table, adding a sense of a little braggadocio and humor.

See also
Antikristos
Bouzouki
Greek dances
Hasapiko
List of dances
Rebetiko
Kamilierikos
Zeibekiko of Evdokia
Zeibeks
Zeybek dance

References

Greek dances